The New Caledonia national baseball team is the national baseball team representing New Caledonia, part of the French Republic. The team is controlled by the New Caledonia Baseball Association. The team won Silver at the 2007 South Pacific Games.

Placings
South Pacific Games
 2007 :  2nd

National baseball teams
Baseball